Mordellistena carinata is a beetle in the genus Mordellistena of the family Mordellidae. It was described in 1930 by Ray.

References

carinata
Beetles described in 1930